Gengma Dai and Va Autonomous County is located in Lincang City, in the west of Yunnan province, China.

History
In 1988, the county was affected by two strong earthquakes. It killed a total of 939 people and caused major destruction.

Administrative divisions
Gengma Dai and Va Autonomous County has 4 towns, 4 townships and 1 ethnic township. 
4 towns

4 townships

1 ethnic township
 Manghong Lahu and Bulang

Climate

Ethnic groups
There are 1,004 Jingpo people located in the following five villages of Gengma County.
New Jingpo hamlet 景颇新寨, Mangkang Village 芒抗村, Hepai Township 贺派乡
Nalong 那拢组, Nongba Village 弄巴村, Gengma Town 耿马镇
Hewen 贺稳组, Jingxin Village 景信村, Mengding Town 孟定镇
Hebianzhai 河边寨, Qiushan Village 邱山村, Mengding Town 孟定镇
Caobazhai 草坝寨, Mang'ai Village 芒艾村, Mengding Town 孟定镇

References

External links
Gengma County Official Site

 
County-level divisions of Lincang
Dai autonomous counties
Wa autonomous counties